Spudulike is a restaurant chain and franchise specialising in baked potatoes (potatoes being known as "spuds" in colloquial British English) that first opened in Edinburgh in 1974. Spudulike sold baked potatoes with various fillings, other potato based meals, and side dishes.

Spudulike was founded by Kim Culley and Barbara Cain. The company was acquired by the British School of Motoring (BSM) in 1979, which helped Spudulike to rapidly expand its business as a franchise operation. It later demerged from BSM, and in May 2001, it bought Courts Quality Foods, owner of rival potato brand Fat Jackets. Spudulike had fifty outlets across the United Kingdom in 2001, including twenty Courts franchises.

The company entered into one company voluntary arrangement in July 2019, in an attempt to restructure its debt, then on 1 August, filed for administration, with all thirty seven remaining outlets closed. Potato firm Albert Bartlett acquired a number of stores of Spudulike in September 2019, and reopened them in October 2019, with an updated menu. In October 2021,  TV chef James Martin teamed up with Albert Bartlett to launch an updated Spudulike menu.

References

External links 
 

1974 establishments in Scotland
Fast-food chains of the United Kingdom
British companies established in 1974
Restaurants established in 1974
Restaurant franchises
1974 establishments in the United Kingdom
Companies that have entered administration in the United Kingdom